George E. Morgan (October 9, 1870 – 1969) was a Maine folk artist.

Early life
George Eugene Morgan was born to George William and Vesta Rowena Farnham Morgan of Chelsea (three and a half miles west of Gardiner, Maine). As a young man and as most in the area, Morgan found work along the Kennebec, first in Augusta with a furniture maker, then for many years as a harness maker, and then for even more years he worked in the shoe factories of Gardiner (Commonwealth Shoe Company and then R. P. Hazzard Company). He was ranked a sergeant in the Maine Militia and when World War I broke out, Morgan already forty-seven was deemed too old for service. He married twice and had five children.

Artistic career
In the spring of 1962, Morgan was ninety-one years old and living in a rest home in Gardiner. Morgan was not one to sit idle and though sketching on paper and cardboard occupied him for some time, he ached for something more. Word got out and apparently through some connection at the home, Morgan was introduced to a local folk art and antiques dealer, Anne Wardwell of Farmingdale. When Wardwell met Morgan she must have seen something that inspired her. In the words of Howard Rose, from Unexpected Eloquence, "Mrs. Wardwell seems to have had one of the great prophetic eyes in dealerdom." Wardwell became his benefactor or more so his enabler, providing him with brushes, paints, turpentine and canvas boards. Over the next eighteen months Morgan created twenty plus remarkable memory paintings.

A number of factors come to play as to why Morgan chose the subjects that he did and how he painted them—the bicentennial of Hallowell (which fueled a desire to see the Kennebec River towns for what they once were), his age (an old mind best remembers events and details of one's youth than of the more recent), a lack of mobility (living in a rest home and having an indifference to car travel limited his ability to paint these towns en plein air), and though it is usually said of writing, it could be inferred that he thought of the adage, "write [paint] what you know." As a resident of Kennebec County for nearly one hundred years, Morgan knew the environs of Hallowell, Gardiner and Randolph better than anyone alive.

It is true that for most the immediate attraction to Morgan's work is the folky sense of perspective and his color sense. However, one is taken in well beyond this initial blush. His works combine an innate formal grasp of composition with complex definitions of area and space, color, and balance—as well as a terrific sense of engagement and detachment.

Old Covered Bridge between Randolph and Gardiner,  his earliest dated work, reveals a sophisticated hold on translating a large scale real-world geographical area into a small two-dimensional space. The broadly defined spaces of color and short perspective remind us of another artist working in Maine, Milton Avery. Or even a Diebenkorn. The same applies for Moulton Mill, and Ice Houses on the Kennebec River. The topography is delineated in broad shapes and laid out in colors that work in a formal sense, not necessarily in a real-world sense. Accuracy did not trump color or compositional balance. Representational artists even have to lie a little.

The body of Morgan's work is best and most often described as "map-like". His townscapes and depictions of local landmarks are often seen from overhead and/or from a high-vantage point. They provide for us, almost literally, a road-map of these towns as they were at the turn of the twentieth century. The three works, Hallowell: View of Lower Water Street, Freshet 1923 , Bridge Dividing Kennebec River, done in a flourish in just two months (June and July 1963) are arguably his most complex, finest and accessible works. In each, Morgan precisely tries to work out the perspective (a ruler was always at hand), however it is never (academically) correct. In the essay, "Mapping as a Cultural Universal", the authors assert that "to communicate...mapmakers distort...distortions from accepted veridicality may be the result of attempts to increase the map's informational value." Though Morgan's unconventional perspective is incorrect, it is more informative—showing us spaces and details of buildings that we would not otherwise see.

Retirement
George Morgan retired aged ninety-four. He died in Augusta, Maine 1969, aged 99.

Exhibitions
The Playhouse, Boothbay, Maine 1963
Farnsworth Art Museum, Rockland, Maine, "George E. Morgan: Self Taught Painter of Maine" July 16 - October 11, 1998
The Center for Intuitive and Outsider Art, Chicago, IL, "George E. Morgan: Maine Streets" February 5 - April 10, 1999

Literature
"Painter Makes Primitives of Early Boyhood Scenes," KENNEBEC JOURNAL, Augusta, Maine, February 18, 1966, Ruth Henderson
UNEXPECTED ELOQUENCE, The Edith Blum Art Institute, Bard College, Annandale-on-Hudson, 1990, by Howard Rose
THE POOLES OF PISMO BAY, published by Raymond Saroff, 1990, by Howard Rose
"George E. Morgan: Self Taught Maine Artist," FOLK ART MAGAZINE, Summer 1998, p. 33 by Chippy Irvine
"Art," CHICAGO READER, Chicago, Illinois, March 12, 1999, Fred Camper
MEMORIES OF THE KENNEBEC, published by S. Scott Powers Antiques, 2006, by Steven S. Powers

Artists from Maine
1870 births
1969 deaths
People from Kennebec County, Maine
People from Gardiner, Maine